NACD is an acronym for:

 National Association for Cave Diving
 National Association of Corporate Directors